The Charleroi-Monessen Bridge, officially the John K. Tener Memorial Bridge, is a two lane structure spanning the Monongahela River.  The bridge connects North Charleroi in Washington County, Pennsylvania and Monessen in Westmoreland County, Pennsylvania. The structure connects Route 88 on the west bank of the river and Route 906 on the east side.  The bridge, which opened in 2013, replaced a 1906 structure. The original bridge was closed in 2009 due to structural deficiency.

Current bridge
Construction delays caused the original December 2012 projected opening date to be pushed back to June 29, 2013. The Pennsylvania Legislature voted to name the new bridge after Mon Valley native John Tener, a former U.S. Representative and state governor.  Tener, an ex-professional baseball player who organized the first congressional baseball game, owned the Mercantile Bridge Company, which designed the original bridge that connected the two cities. .

Previous bridge

The 1906 bridge, a three-span steel truss structure, was imploded shortly before 9:00 a.m. on Monday, July 11, 2011.  The new bridge was constructed in its place.

The 1906 bridge was designated as a historic bridge by the Washington County History & Landmarks Foundation.

See also
List of bridges documented by the Historic American Engineering Record in Pennsylvania
List of crossings of the Monongahela River

References

External links

Demolition of the Charleroi-Monessen Bridge (2011)

[ National Register nomination form]

Bridges over the Monongahela River
Bridges in Washington County, Pennsylvania
Bridges completed in 1906
Road bridges on the National Register of Historic Places in Pennsylvania
Historic American Engineering Record in Pennsylvania
National Register of Historic Places in Washington County, Pennsylvania
Steel bridges in the United States
1906 establishments in Pennsylvania